KVIJ-TV was a television station on channel 8 licensed to Sayre, Oklahoma, United States. It was owned by Marsh Media and served as a satellite station of its KVII-TV in Amarillo, Texas. The transmitter was located northwest of Sayre at the intersection of State Highway 152 and State Highway 6.

Originally a separate station in Elk City under the KSWB call letters, it was soon acquired and moved to Sayre, where it served in turn as a semi-satellite of two different Amarillo television stations—first KFDA-TV, then KVII-TV. Marsh shut the station down on December 2, 1992, citing the availability of Oklahoma-based ABC affiliates on cable in KVIJ-TV's service area.

History
KSWB began broadcasting on August 7, 1961, nearly four years after the award of its construction permit on November 20, 1957. It was owned by—and named for—the Southwest Broadcasting Company; its primary investor was Lonnie Preston, who owned radio station KWOE at nearby Clinton and had previously owned Elk City station KASA. KSWB-TV was an independent station, with local program features including a children's hour, women's show, and a 9:00 newscast. The KSWB-TV call letters now reside on a Fox-affiliated station in San Diego, California.

KSWB was not a financially successful venture. In June 1965, Southwest Broadcasting sold channel 8 to the Bass Broadcasting Company, which owned KFDA-TV, the CBS affiliate in Amarillo. While the sale was pending, Bass filed to move the channel 8 license and facility from Elk City to Sayre; meanwhile, the station also suspended operations on August 11, 1965, due to financial difficulties. The call letters were changed to KFDO-TV, and Bass received program test authority from the Federal Communications Commission to begin broadcasting as a satellite from Sayre on May 13, 1966. Under Bass management, KFDA-TV stationed a reporter in the Sayre–Elk City area and also employed four technical personnel at the transmitter.

In 1975, Marsh Media purchased KFDO-TV for $300,000, from Bass—its direct competitor in Amarillo. In time for coverage of the 1976 Winter Olympics on ABC, the sale was closed and KFDO-TV became KVIJ-TV, rebroadcasting KVII-TV, on January 29, 1976.

References

VIJ-TV
Television channels and stations established in 1961
1961 establishments in Oklahoma
Television channels and stations disestablished in 1992
1992 disestablishments in Oklahoma
Defunct television stations in the United States
VIJ-TV